The Isuzu 810 (kana:いすゞ810) is a heavy duty truck that was produced by Isuzu. First introduced in 1983 as a successor to the Isuzu New Power (including V8SS, V10SS and V12SS) and was replaced by Isuzu Giga in 1995. Outside Japan, the truck series are in the "C" and "E", with "C" indicating a rigid design and "E" being used on semi-tractors. With the domestic competitors were the Nissan Diesel Resona, the Hino Super Dolphin and the Mitsubishi Fuso The Great.

History

 In August 1983, the 810 series appeared as a successor to the new power. Among the domestic heavy-duty trucks, the time of the full model change was a late group ( Mitsubishi Fuso the Great also appeared at about the same time as the 810), but the headlights were four round headlights. PC ## system. It will be equipped with an engine one-key system that can be preheated and stopped only with the ignition key, and the battery relay switch will be abolished. In addition, it is equipped with a multi-use seat and bed that can be expanded by tilting the passenger seat and the center seat. The fog lights are the same as the Nissan Diesel Resona . The features of the previous model are that the fender rubber on the front fender is only on all fenders near the step, and the flat shape of the step part.

 September 1983 Added tractor. Of the semi-tractors, the 2-axle car was renamed EXR and the 3-axle car (2 differential) was renamed EXZ. Added full tractor to CXG and CXZ. Semi-tractors are available in V10 and V12, and full tractors are available only in V12 engines. The "TRACTOR" logo and stripes were placed on the upper part of the black belt on the front lid of the semi-tractor to differentiate it from the cargo type of a motorcycle.

 In February 1986, a minor change was made, and the car name was changed to 810 Super with a subname. Compliant with noise regulations in 1985 . Changed the headlights from 4 round headlights to 4 rectangular square headlights. Since the area of the headlights is different, the shape of the lower part of the front lid is also straight from the inverted convex type. The press line at the bottom of the door has become a style that continues straight to the front grill. The shape of the step and fender rubber has also been changed. Equipped with a steering lock. Newly developed turbo engine 6SD1 is newly installed in CXH23 etc.

 September 1986 Isuzu's original automatic transmission NAVi 6 is available as an option .

 July 1987 Added a car equipped with air suspension to the cargo system. Equipped with a leveling valve that keeps the vehicle height constant. In addition, the CXG full tractor is equipped with the intercooler turbo 6RB1 type.

 September 1989 Minor change, 810 Super II. The radiator grill has been changed, and the interior has been fully trimmed. Optional setting of permanent magnet type retarder . Compliant with emission regulations in 1989 ( V-type P series becomes P D by U-** conversion ). The cargo system will be the UC system and the tractor will be the W-EX system. The arrow feather mark also changed the specifications and position of the emblem body, added corner rubber to the bumper, changed the shape of the speed indicator case, and it was the same color as the cab until then, but it was based on black. The lines above and below the ISUZU logo are painted white. The window layout on the driver's side has also been changed.

 January 1991 Equipped with permanent magnet type lidada on U-CXM23V and U-CXG23X.

 May 1991 All semi-tractor models are equipped with ABS and air suspension seats with automatic weight adjustment mechanism as standard equipment.

 July 1992 Big minor change, 810EX (Hachiichimaru X). UC ## series. The front mask has been redesigned, and the headlamps have been changed from the standard type 4 square lamps to the specially designed 2 variant lamps. This headlight is the same as the Elf , Forward and Super Cruiser since 1990. Nishiko Neoroyal C type 92MC and Fuji Heavy 17 type late type ( other than Nissan Diesel chassis) are also equipped with this headlight. Since this light is the same size as the conventional four square eyes, there are some modifications to transplant the light for 810EX to Resona and Super Dolphin . Changed the ISUZU logo to the current font. The ISUZU logo is white in the cargo system, but it is plated in the semi-tractor, and it is differentiated by plating the lower part of the front lid. The "TRACTOR" logo has become smaller and has moved from the top of the black belt to the bottom of the black belt. The bumper has also been redesigned because the fog lights are built into the headlights. The straight-six turbo system will be changed from 6RB1 to 6WA1 system with 24-valve OHC , and will be U-CXM50 etc. Partial standardization of retarder. Some grades have a computer -controlled hill-start assist device that maintains braking force.(HSA) is attached.

 October 1993 Exhibited the 810EX City Dump Truck as a reference at the 30th Tokyo Motor Show .

 November 1994 Discontinued except for all-wheel drive vehicles. The successor car is Giga .

 1995 All-wheel drive vehicles are also discontinued.

Line Up

 CXM 6 × 2R
 CXL 6 × 2R ( air suspension )
 CXK 6 × 2R (NK suspension, lightweight leaf suspension )
 CXH 8 × 4
 CVZ 6 × 4 (low-floor vehicle)
 CXZ 6 × 4
 CXG 6 × 2F
 CVR 4 × 2
 EXR 4 × 2 semi-tractor
 EXD 4 × 2 Semi-tractor (air suspension)
 EXZ 6 × 4 Semi-tractor
 CVS 4x4 semi-tractor
 CVS 4 × 4 snowplow
 CXW 6 × 6 snowplow
 ZYZ 6 × 2 Private car on the premises (15t)
 ZZZ 6 × 2 Private car on the premises (20t)

Onboard Engine
Category" in the table below indicates the next two digits of the three letters of the vehicle type alphabet (C ** or EX * above).

"Category" in the table below indicates the next two digits of the three letters of the vehicle type alphabet (C ** or EX * above).

References

810